McMurdo is a crater in the Mare Australe quadrangle of Mars, located at 84.4° S and 359.1° W.  It is 30.3 km in diameter and was named after McMurdo Station in Antarctica.

Many layers are visible in the south wall of the crater.  Many places on Mars show rocks arranged in layers. The study of layering on Mars greatly expanded when the Mars Global Surveyor sent back images.  Rock can form layers in a variety of ways.  Volcanoes, wind, or water can produce layers.
A detailed discussion of layering with many Martian examples can be found in Sedimentary Geology of Mars.  A paper by Grotzinger and Milliken discusses the role of water and wind in forming layers of sedimentary rocks.

Just to the south of McMurdo is a field of numerous short, dark streaks or fans.  These are caused by the outgassing of carbon dioxide in the spring when the temperature is rising.  The carbon dioxide gas carries with it dark particles.  If a wind is blowing at the time, the plume of material is spread to one side forming a streak or a fan; these features have been called spiders because at times they look like spiders with many legs.  Both layers and fans are shown in the pictures below.

See also
 Geology of Mars
 Geyser (Mars)
 HiRISE
 Impact crater
 Impact event
 List of craters on Mars
 Ore resources on Mars
 Planetary nomenclature

References 

Mare Australe quadrangle
Impact craters on Mars